Naugad is a Gaupalika in Darchula District in the Sudurpashchim Province of far-western Nepal. Naugad has a population of 15874.The land area is 180.27 km2.

References

Rural municipalities in Darchula District
Rural municipalities of Nepal established in 2017